Adolfo Alperi (born 12 September 1970) is a Spanish cyclist. He competed at the 1992 Summer Olympics and the 1996 Summer Olympics.

References

External links
 

1970 births
Living people
Spanish male cyclists
Olympic cyclists of Spain
Cyclists at the 1992 Summer Olympics
Cyclists at the 1996 Summer Olympics
Sportspeople from Oviedo
Cyclists from Asturias
20th-century Spanish people